The New England Patriots are a professional American football team based in the Greater Boston area. The Patriots compete in the National Football League (NFL) as a member club of the league's American Football Conference (AFC) East division. The franchise is owned by Robert Kraft, who purchased the team in 1994. As of 2023, the Patriots are the second most valuable sports team in the world and have sold out every home game since 1994.

Founded in 1959 as the Boston Patriots, the team was a charter member of the American Football League (AFL) before joining the NFL in 1970 through the AFL–NFL merger. The Patriots played their home games at various stadiums throughout Boston until the franchise moved to Foxborough in 1971. As part of the move, the team changed its name to the New England Patriots. Home games were played at Foxboro Stadium until 2002 when the stadium was demolished alongside the opening of Gillette Stadium. The team began utilizing Gillette Stadium for home games the same year.

The Patriots hold the records for most Super Bowl wins (6, tied with the Pittsburgh Steelers), appearances (11), and losses (5, tied with the Denver Broncos). Generally unsuccessful prior to the 21st century, the franchise enjoyed a period of dominance under head coach Bill Belichick and quarterback Tom Brady from 2001 to 2019. The Brady–Belichick era, regarded as one of the greatest sports dynasties, would see the Patriots claim nearly every major Super Bowl record. Other NFL records held by the franchise include the most playoff wins (37), the most wins in a 10-year period (126 from 2003 to 2012), the longest winning streak of regular season and playoff games (21 from October 2003 to October 2004), the most consecutive winning seasons (19 from 2001 to 2019), the most consecutive conference championship appearances (8 from 2011 to 2018), the most consecutive division titles (11 from 2009 to 2019), the only undefeated 16-game regular season (2007), and the highest postseason winning percentage (.638).

Franchise history

Brief summary

On November 16, 1959, Boston business executive Billy Sullivan was awarded the eighth and final franchise of the developing American Football League (AFL). The following winter, locals were allowed to submit ideas for the Boston football team's official name. The most popular choice – and the one that Sullivan selected – was the "Boston Patriots", with "Patriots" referring to the colonists of the Thirteen Colonies who rebelled against British control during the American Revolution and in July 1776 declared the United States of America an independent nation, which heavily involved the then-colony of Massachusetts. Immediately thereafter, artist Phil Bissell of The Boston Globe developed the "Pat Patriot" logo.

The Patriots never had a regular home stadium in the AFL. Nickerson Field, Harvard Stadium, Fenway Park (shared with baseball's Boston Red Sox), and Boston College's Alumni Stadium all served as home fields during their time in the American Football League. The 1963 season saw the franchise's first playoff win over Buffalo to clinch the division. They subsequently lost the AFL championship game to the San Diego Chargers 51–10. They did not appear again in an AFL or NFL post-season game for another 13 years.

When the NFL and AFL merged in 1970, the Patriots were placed in the American Football Conference (AFC) East division, where they still play. The following year, the Patriots moved to a new stadium in Foxborough, Massachusetts, which would serve as their home for the next 30 years. As a result of the move, they announced they would change their name from the Boston Patriots to the Bay State Patriots, after the state of Massachusetts. The name was rejected by the NFL and on March 22, 1971, the team officially announced they would change its geographic name to New England.

During the 1970s, the Patriots had some success under head coach Chuck Fairbanks, earning a berth to the playoffs in 1976 – as a wild card team – and in 1978 – as AFC East champions. They lost in the first round both times.  Under his successor, Ron Erhardt, the team finished one game out of the playoffs his first two years.  The next coach, Ron Meyer, led the team to the playoffs in the strike-shortened 1982 season, and despite not having a losing record during his career, he was fired in 1984 due to poor relationships with players and management.  Hall-of-Fame player Raymond Berry was hired as his replacement, and in 1985, he brought the team to its first AFC Championship and a berth in Super Bowl XX, which they lost to the Chicago Bears 46–10. Following their Super Bowl loss, they returned to the playoffs in 1986, but lost in the first round. Berry left the team following a disappointing 1989 season, and his replacement Rod Rust only lasted one season, 1990, during which the Patriots went 1–15. During the late 1980s and early 1990s they changed ownership several times, being purchased from the Sullivan family first by Victor Kiam in 1988, who sold the team to James Orthwein in 1992. Though Orthwein's period as owner was short and controversial, he did oversee major changes to the team, first with the hiring of former New York Giants coach Bill Parcells in 1993. Orthwein and his marketing team then defied Patriots fans' overwhelming preference and commissioned the NFL to develop a new visual identity and logo, and changed their primary colors from the traditional red, white and blue to blue and silver for the team uniforms. Orthwein intended to move the team to his native St. Louis (where it would have been renamed as the St. Louis Stallions), but instead sold the team in 1994 for $175million to Boston paper magnate Robert Kraft, who had bought the Patriots' then-home, Foxboro Stadium, out of bankruptcy in 1988.

Continuing on as head coach under Kraft's ownership, Parcells would bring the Patriots to two playoff appearances, including Super Bowl XXXI (following the 1996 season), which they lost to the Green Bay Packers by a score of 35–21. Pete Carroll, Parcells's successor, would also take the team to the playoffs twice in 1997 and 1998 before being dismissed as head coach after the 1999 season.

The Patriots hired head coach Bill Belichick, who had served as defensive coordinator under Parcells including during Super Bowl XXXI, in 2000. Their new home field, Gillette Stadium, opened in 2002 to replace the aging Foxboro Stadium. Long–time starting quarterback Drew Bledsoe, who was the franchise's star throughout the 1990s, went down with a sheared blood vessel in his chest in a week two match–up in 2001 against the rival New York Jets. Backup quarterback Tom Brady, drafted by the Patriots in sixth round of the 2000 NFL draft, became the starting quarterback. Brady's successful play led to Bledsoe never getting his job back as a starter, and would serve as the franchise's starting quarterback for the next 18 years. Under Belichick and Brady, the Patriots became one of the most consistently dominant teams in the NFL, with many describing the team as a "dynasty". Within the first few seasons of the 21st century, the team won three Super Bowls in four seasons (2001, 2003, and 2004), over the St. Louis Rams, Carolina Panthers, and Philadelphia Eagles, respectively. The Patriots finished the 2007 regular season with a perfect 16–0 record, becoming only the fourth team in league history to go undefeated in the regular season, and the only one since the league expanded its regular season schedule to 16 games. After advancing to Super Bowl XLII, the team's fourth Super Bowl in seven years, the Patriots were upset by the Giants to end their bid for a 19–0 season. With the loss, the Patriots ended the year at 18–1, becoming only one of three teams to go 18–1 along with the 1984 San Francisco 49ers and the 1985 Chicago Bears. However, both the Bears and 49ers lost their only game during the regular season, and both would win their respective Super Bowl.

The Patriots returned to the Super Bowl in 2011 but lost again to the Giants, 21–17. In 2014, the Patriots reached a record-tying eighth Super Bowl, where they defeated the defending champion Seattle Seahawks by a score of 28–24 to win Super Bowl XLIX for their fourth title. After Seattle had driven the ball to New England's 1-yard line with under a minute to go, New England rookie cornerback Malcolm Butler made a critical interception on Seattle's final offensive play that helped to seal the victory. New England became the first team to reach nine Super Bowls in the 2016–17 playoffs and faced the Atlanta Falcons in Super Bowl LI. Losing 28–3 midway through the third quarter, the Patriots scored 25 unanswered points to tie the game in the final seconds of regulation. In the first overtime in Super Bowl history, the Patriots won the coin toss and scored a touchdown to claim their fifth Super Bowl victory. The Patriots extended their record to ten Super Bowl appearances in the 2017–18 playoffs but lost to the Philadelphia Eagles in Super Bowl LII. The Patriots returned to the championship game for a third consecutive season in Super Bowl LIII, where they defeated the Los Angeles Rams 13–3 to win their sixth Super Bowl, tying them with the Pittsburgh Steelers for most Super Bowl victories in NFL history.

Following a disappointing 2019 season, in which the team lost in the first round of the playoffs, and in which the long-time Brady–Belichick partnership was strained due to Brady wanting to have more input in organizational decisions, Brady left for free agency and was signed by the Tampa Bay Buccaneers.  To replace him, the Patriots signed veteran quarterback Cam Newton, but after an even more disappointing 2020 season, which saw the team miss the playoffs with their first losing record in two decades, the team drafted Mac Jones in the first round of the 2021 NFL Draft, and released Newton after naming Jones the starting quarterback just prior to the team's first game of the 2021 season. Jones led the team to their first playoff berth without Brady since 1998, but they would lose 47–17 to the division rival Buffalo Bills in the Wild Card round.

Logos and uniforms

Logos

The Patriots original helmet logo was a simple tricorne hat, used only for the 1960 season. From 1961 to 1992, the Patriots used a logo of a Revolutionary War minuteman hiking a football. The Patriots wordmark logo during this time consisted of a western-style font. The minuteman logo became known as the "Pat Patriot" logo, which later became the name of the team's mascot.

In 1979, the Patriots worked with NFL Properties to design a new, streamlined logo, to replace the complex Pat Patriot logo. The new logo featured the blue and white profile of a minuteman in a tricorne hat set against a flag showing three red stripes separated by two white stripes. Team owner Billy Sullivan decided to put the new logo up to a vote against Pat Patriot with the fans at the September 23 home game against the San Diego Chargers, using a sound level meter to judge the crowd's reaction. The new logo was decidedly rejected by the crowd in favor of Pat, and the concept was shelved.

In 1993, a new logo was unveiled involving the gray face of a minuteman wearing a red, white and royal blue hat that begins as a tricorne and transitions into a flowing banner-like design.  It became popularly known as the "Flying Elvis" due to many observing its resemblance to the profile of a young Elvis Presley. A new script logo was introduced as well in tandem with the "Flying Elvis", utilizing a cursive font.

In 2000, the blue color used on the tricorne of the "Flying Elvis" as well as the outline of the cursive wordmark was switched from royal blue to nautical blue to coincide with the uniform change in the new millennium.

On July 3, 2013, the Patriots unveiled a new wordmark to accompany the "Flying Elvis", which replaced the script of their previous cursive typeface with modernized block letters (colored in blue or white depending on the background), and modified the "Flying Elvis" to be underneath instead of flowing up-top. While appearing everywhere else, it was not applied on the uniforms until the 2015 season due to NFL uniform policies.

Uniforms

1960–1992

The Patriots' primary uniforms remained largely unchanged from the franchises' inaugural season until 1993. The Patriots originally wore red jerseys with white block numbering at home, and white jerseys with red block numbering on the road. Both uniforms used white pants and white helmets, first with the hat logo over the player's number, then with the "Pat Patriot" logo starting in 1961. A blue stripe was added to the two red helmet stripes in 1964. The numbers on both the home and away jerseys gained a blue outline in 1973. In 1979, the Patriots began the first of many sporadic runs of wearing red pants with the white jerseys. The red pants were dropped in 1981, but returned in 1984. After being dropped again in 1988, they were used again from 1990 to 1992.

1993–1999

The Patriots underwent a complete identity overhaul before the 1993 season, starting with the introduction of the aforementioned "Flying Elvis" logo. The new uniforms consisted of a royal blue home jersey and a white away jersey. The helmet was silver with the Flying Elvis logo and no additional striping. Both uniforms used silver pants, originally with stripes designed to look like those flowing from the Flying Elvis, but these were changed to simple red and blue stripes after one season. When they debuted, both the home and away jerseys used red block numbers with a blue and white outline, but after one season the home uniforms switched to the now-familiar white with a red outline.

In 1995, the Patriots switched the block numbers to a more modern rounded number font with a dropshadow. The Patriots were one of the first adopters of custom numbers, a trend that would grow drastically over the next 20 years.

2000–2019

In 2000, the Patriots then became one of the few teams at the time to drop the rounded numbers and switch back to block numbers. The shade of blue was switched for the first time in the franchises' history, from royal to nautical blue. The jerseys once again had the number on the shoulders while the logo moved back to the sleeves. "New Century" silver stripes were also added to the home jersey, with nautical blue stripes appearing on the away jersey. The Patriots, unsatisfied with the 1990s white-on-silver road look, also took the opportunity to introduce blue pants to be worn with the white jersey, offering a better contrast. To better match the blue pants, the number on the white jersey was switched from red to blue.

Though the Patriots had generally worn silver pants with the blue jerseys, and navy pants with the white jerseys, they did wear an all-blue set during the 2002 season. On two consecutive home games that season, the Patriots wore blue tops with their road blue pants and white socks; they lost both games (Week 6 vs. the Packers, and Week 8 vs. the Broncos). The team would not wear an all-blue set again until the introduction of the Color Rush uniforms in 2016.

Throughout the 2011 season, the Patriots wore dark patches with white lettering on their uniforms with the initials 'MHK' in honor of Myra Kraft, the late long-time spouse of owner Robert Kraft.

2020–present

For the 2020 season, the Patriots made some changes to their uniform. The all-blue "Color Rush" design became the primary home uniform, complete with updated block letters and numbers, and blue/red/white socks. A corresponding white uniform was also unveiled, also paired with the blue pants. Both uniforms featured truncated shoulder striping as a nod to the "Pat Patriot" uniforms. Coincidentally, the arrival of new jerseys occurred with the departure of long-time quarterback, Tom Brady, from the Patriots. Brady was in New England exactly between the last uniform change in 2000, and left before the 2020 uniform change in 2019.

The Patriots brought back the silver pants to pair with the current uniforms in a 2022 Week 7 home game on Monday Night Football against the Chicago Bears. Unlike the previous silver pants the team wore from 2000 to 2019, this design featured thicker red stripes, matching the same width as the middle blue stripe.

Alternate uniforms
In 1994, the Patriots wore the "Pat Patriot" helmets and plain white striped pants from two seasons prior as alternates as part of the NFL's 75th-anniversary celebration. In 2002, NFL teams were allowed to add a permanent third jersey to be worn in a maximum of two games. The Patriots reintroduced a red jersey as their alternate, complemented with the old-style "Pat Patriot" helmet. In 2003, the Patriots changed their alternate to a silver jersey with blue pants. For this uniform, the "Flying Elvis" helmet was used. The uniform was identical to the white jersey with any areas of white replaced by silver. These uniforms were dropped after 2007. No alternate uniform was used in 2008. In 2009, the red alternate was reintroduced, again accompanied by the "Pat Patriot" helmet. An alternate white road jersey was also worn with the older helmet for one game, using red numbers, in tribute to the 50th anniversary of the AFL. The red alternate gained a blue outline around the numbers in 2010 and this was worn through 2012. The Patriots temporarily retired their alternate red uniforms in 2013, thanks to a new NFL rule outlawing throwback alternate helmets, and restricting teams to one helmet shell only. However, after the NFL reinstated the use of alternate helmets in 2022, the Patriots brought back the throwback red uniforms.

In 2016, the Patriots took part in the NFL's Color Rush program, wearing monochrome navy uniforms on September 22 against the Houston Texans. The uniform tops were patterned after the 1980s Pat Patriot-era uniforms, while the pants featured thick white stripes with red accents. They have worn them a total of four times since 2016. In 2017, an all-white Color Rush uniform was introduced and used for the Patriots' Thursday night road game against the Tampa Bay Buccaneers.

Facilities

Stadium and headquarters

Since 2002, the Patriots' home stadium has been Gillette Stadium, a $350million facility privately financed by Robert Kraft, located in Foxborough, Massachusetts. It houses the team's practice facilities, the team's administrative offices, as well as its owning entity's, The Kraft Group, along with the Kraft-owned Major League Soccer team, the New England Revolution. The field, which was originally natural grass, was replaced with a FieldTurf surface during the 2006 season. Despite not being around for more than 20 years, Gillette Stadium is home to the second most postseason games ever, Candlestick Park being first with 27 total. The Patriots have a 19–4 playoff record in this stadium as of the conclusion of the 2019 NFL season, the AFC playoffs consistently had the Patriots playing from home in 2001–2019. The area around the stadium was developed, beginning in 2007, into a $375million "lifestyle and entertainment center" called Patriot Place; among its largest structures is a multi-floor restaurant and bar called CBS Scene.

Prior to 2002, the Patriots played in Foxboro Stadium dating back to 1971, the team's second year in the NFL after the AFL–NFL merger, and this venue was also privately funded. The final game in this stadium was the 2001 AFC Divisional Playoff game which was a 16–13 overtime win over the visiting Oakland Raiders, known for the raging snowstorm and the "tuck rule" call.

During the team's days in the American Football League and its first year in the NFL, the Boston Patriots were hosted by a number of fields in or around Boston – they played at Nickerson Field (1960–62), Fenway Park (1963–68), Alumni Stadium (1969), and Harvard Stadium (1970).

Training camp and practice

The Patriots hold training camp and practices just outside of Gillette Stadium in Foxborough, with twin practice fields available for team use.

Prior to 2003, the Patriots held training camp and practice at numerous locations. From 1976 to 2002, the team held training camp at Bryant College in Smithfield, Rhode Island. From 1960 to 1961, then from 1969 to 1975, the Patriots held training camp at University of Massachusetts Amherst. Between 1962 and 1968, the Patriots held training camp at Phillips Academy in Andover, Massachusetts.

From 1971 until 2001, the Patriots would simply practice at Foxboro Stadium whenever the field was available, otherwise they would use the public football fields that were available in Foxborough.

Aircraft

In 2017, the Patriots purchased two Boeing 767-300ERs for use as team planes, with one serving as the backup, which were ready in time for the 2017 NFL season. This made them the first team in league history to own their own planes. At the time it was getting more difficult for professional sports teams to book private charter flights, with eight teams being dropped that season, as major commercial airlines were instead focusing on more profitable scheduled flights. The two jet airliners, N366AA and N39367, were previously operated by American Airlines from 1991 to 2016. The planes are known affectionately as "AirKrafts" after team owner Robert Kraft. Kraft has lent one of the planes to transport students to the March for Our Lives demonstration in Washington, D.C. Both planes are currently operating for the American airline, Eastern Airlines, LLC.

Rivalries

In terms of number of games played, the Patriots have competed most against other teams in the AFC East division: the Buffalo Bills, Miami Dolphins, and New York Jets, who were all a part of the AFC East division since the AFL-NFL Merger, as well as the former AFL Eastern division. The Patriots also share rivalries with several teams outside of their division, including the Indianapolis Colts, who were members of the AFC East from 1970 to 2001, the Baltimore Ravens, the Denver Broncos, the Pittsburgh Steelers and the Las Vegas Raiders. Outside of the AFC, the Patriots also had a memorable rivalry with the New York Giants.

Divisional rivals

New York Jets

The closest rivalry geographically has been that with the New York Jets. The Patriots and Jets have been in the same division (what is now the AFC East) since both teams' foundings in 1960, and have played each other at least twice a year since then. The rivalry between the Jets and Patriots has escalated since 1996, when Patriots head coach Bill Parcells left the Patriots under controversy to become the head coach of the Jets; he was replaced by former Jets coach Pete Carroll. Four years later, Carroll was fired, and Parcells's assistant, Bill Belichick, resigned the day he was named the Jets' head coach to become the head coach of the Patriots. Six years after that, Eric Mangini, an assistant under Belichick, became the head coach of the Jets.

Bill Belichick achieved his 200th career head coaching win (regular season and playoffs) on November 22, 2012, defeating the Jets 49–19; it was his 163rd such win as Patriots coach. Belichick also passed George Halas for second most career head coaching wins (regular season and playoffs) with his 325th win on October 30, 2022, in a 22–17 victory over the Jets.

Buffalo Bills

The Patriots and the Bills were both charter members of the AFL, and even competed with each other in an AFL playoff game. They have remained divisional rivals since the NFL-AFL merger. Prior to the rise of Tom Brady, the two teams shared a mellow, yet occasionally competitive rivalry, featuring highlights from players such as O. J. Simpson, Steve Grogan, Joe Ferguson, Jim Kelly, and Drew Bledsoe. However, Brady dominated the Bills during his tenure as the Patriots' franchise quarterback, holding a 32–3 regular-season record over them. Though Patriots fans usually felt apathetic towards the Bills during the Brady era, Bills fans came to despise the Patriots more than any other rival. With the departure of Tom Brady after the 2019 season, the Bills swept the Pats in 2020, including a 38–9 Monday Night Football win that stands as the worst home loss of the Belichick era. It was their first time doing so since 1999, Belichick's first year as head coach and the year before Brady was drafted.
In the 2021–22 NFL playoffs, the Bills defeated the Patriots 47–17 in the rivalry's first playoff matchup in nearly 60 years, with the Bills scoring seven consecutive touchdowns and never punting or attempting a field goal against the Pats defense, making for the NFL's first "perfect offensive game" in history and the worst playoff loss of Belichick's career.

Miami Dolphins

The Patriots first played the Miami Dolphins in 1966 in the AFL, when Miami was one of two expansion teams to debut that year in that league. The Dolphins dominated the Patriots in the 1970s and 1990s, but the two teams remained competitive with each other for years before the rise of Tom Brady. Brady, however, struggled occasionally against the Dolphins in the 2000s before reasserting dominance in the 2010s. The Patriots and Dolphins are the only two teams in the Super Bowl era to post undefeated regular season records, with Miami going 14–0 in 1972 and the Patriots going 16–0 in 2007. Notable moments between the clubs include the Snowplow Game, three playoff matchups, the Dolphins revealing their Wildcat offense against the Patriots, and the Miracle in Miami.

Conference rivals

Baltimore/Indianapolis Colts

The Patriots rivalry with the Baltimore/Indianapolis Colts ran through the two clubs' tenure together in the AFC East (1970–2001). The two clubs clashed in several close games, such as on December 19, 1971, as a late Patriots touchdown decided a 21–17 New England win; on September 18, 1978, the Colts rallied to defeat the Patriots 34–27 on Monday Night Football on a virtual one-man scoring rampage by running back Joe Washington; on September 4, 1983, the Colts defeated the Patriots in overtime 29–23 in their final season in Baltimore. The Patriots defeated the Colts in back-to-back overtime games, 23–17 on December 8, 1991, and 37–34 on November 15, 1992.

Even though the two clubs were placed in separate divisions in the NFL's 2002 divisional realignment, their rivalry did not diminish. At that time, both teams were among the best in the AFC, and both were led by likely Hall of Fame quarterbacks, Peyton Manning (for the Colts) and Tom Brady (for the Patriots). The teams met three times in four years (2003, 2004, 2006) in the playoffs, with the winner going on to win that season's Super Bowl each time. The Manning portion of the rivalry began in Manning's rookie season, 1998; in 1999 Manning suffered a bitter 31–28 loss in September as the Patriots behind Drew Bledsoe erased a 28–7 Colts lead, then defeated the Patriots 20–15 in Indianapolis on December 12. The Brady–Manning portion of the rivalry began on September 30, 2001, as Brady made his first NFL start in a 44–13 Patriots win at Foxboro; on October 21 the Patriots defeated the Colts at the RCA Dome 38–17.

After the Colts left the AFC East in 2002, they first met on November 30, 2003, in a 38–34 Patriots win decided on a last-second goal line stand by the Patriots. The Colts broke a six-game Patriot winning streak in the rivalry in November 2005, then won twice in 2006; in the AFC Championship Game the Colts erased a 21–6 halftime lead; the game lead tied or changed seven times in the second half before a late touchdown led to a 38–34 Colts win. The November 4, 2007, meeting involved both teams being unbeaten to that point; the 8–0 Patriots and the 7–0 Colts. The Patriots rallied to win 24–20. The Colts won again in 2008 and then erased a large Patriots lead in 2009's 4th and 2 game. Manning's final meeting with the Patriots as a Colt came in November 2010; a late interception sealed a 31–28 Patriots win.
In 2012, the Patriots faced the Colts, quarterbacked now by Andrew Luck, on November 18; the Patriots defeated the Colts 59–24. The Patriots also beat the Colts on January 12, 2014, 43–22. The Patriots played the Colts in the playoffs again on January 18, 2015, in the AFC title game, winning 45–7.

Baltimore Ravens

The Ravens first met the New England Patriots in 1996, but the rivalry truly started in 2007 when the Ravens suffered a bitter 27–24 loss in the Patriots' quest for perfection. The rivalry began to escalate in 2009 when the Ravens lost to the Patriots 27–21 in a game that involved a confrontation between Patriots quarterback Tom Brady and Ravens linebacker Terrell Suggs. Both players would go on to take verbal shots at each other through the media after the game. The Ravens defeated the Patriots in the 2009 AFC Wild Card playoff game, 33–14. This was the first time the Ravens had ever defeated the Patriots.
The Ravens faced the Patriots in week six of the 2010 season. The Patriots ended up winning 23–20 in overtime; the game caused controversy from a hit to the helmet of tight end Todd Heap by Patriots safety Brandon Meriweather.

The Ravens played the Patriots for the third consecutive season in the 2011 AFC Championship Game, which the Ravens lost 23–20. The rivalry reached a new level of friction with this, the second career playoff game between the two clubs. The Ravens clawed to a 20–16 lead in the fourth quarter, but Patriots quarterback Tom Brady dove into the end zone to make the score 23–20 with around 11 minutes remaining; this proved to be the winning touchdown. On the Ravens' last possession of the game, quarterback Joe Flacco threw a pass to wide receiver Lee Evans in the corner of the end zone which looked to be the game-winning touchdown, before a last-second strip by Sterling Moore forced the ball from the hands of Evans, forcing the game to be decided on a last-minute field goal by Ravens placekicker Billy Cundiff. With 11 seconds remaining on the clock, the kicker missed the 32-yard field goal attempt, allowing the Patriots to kill the clock on their way to Super Bowl XLVI for a rematch with the New York Giants.

The Ravens' first regular-season win over the Patriots came on September 23, 2012. The game was emotional as receiver Torrey Smith was competing following the death of his brother in a motorcycle accident just the night before. Smith caught two touchdowns in a back and forth game; the Ravens erased a 13–0 lead in the first half and led 14–13, but the Patriots scored at the end of the second quarter for a 20–14 lead. The lead changed twice in the third quarter and the Patriots led 30–21 in the fourth, but the Ravens scored on Smith's second touchdown catch. The Ravens were stopped on fourth down but the Patriots had to punt; in the final two minutes a pass interference penalty on Devin McCourty put the ball at the Patriots 7-yard line; new Ravens kicker Justin Tucker booted a 27-yard field goal on the final play; the ball sailed directly over the upright and was ruled good; the quality of officiating by replacement referees caused controversy as Bill Belichick angrily reached for one of the referees as they were leaving the field, leading to a $50,000 fine later that week.

The two teams met again on January 20, 2013, in the AFC Championship, where the Ravens won 28–13. The Patriots led at halftime, 13–7, but the Ravens defense gave up no points in the 2nd half. It was the first time ever that Tom Brady lost a game at home after leading at halftime, and the first time a road team beat the Patriots in the AFC Championship.

The two teams met once again at Gillette Stadium in the playoffs on January 10, 2015. The Patriots trailed by as much as 14 twice, before beating the Ravens 35–31 to advance to the AFC Championship.

The two teams met with Lamar Jackson as the Ravens quarterback for the first time on Sunday Night Football on November 3, 2019. The 8–0 Patriots were favored over the 5–2 Ravens before the game, but the Ravens won in a blowout, 37–20.

Denver Broncos

The Broncos and Patriots met twice annually during the American Football League (AFL) years from 1960 to 1969, and played in the first-ever AFL game on September 9, 1960. Since , the two teams have met frequently during the regular season, including nine consecutive seasons from 1995 to 2003. As of the end of the  season, the two teams have met in the playoffs five times, with the Broncos owning a 4–1 record. The teams' first playoff match on January 4, 1987 was John Elway's first career playoff win, while the teams' second playoff match on January 14, 2006 game was the Broncos' first playoff win since Elway's retirement after the 1998 season. The game was also notable for Champ Bailey's 100-yard interception that resulted in a touchdown-saving tackle by Benjamin Watson at the 1-yard line. On October 11, 2009, the two teams met with former Patriots' offensive coordinator, Josh McDaniels as the Broncos' head coach. Both teams wore their AFL 50th anniversary jerseys. The game featured a 98-yard drive in the fourth quarter, with a game-tying touchdown pass from Kyle Orton to Brandon Marshall, followed by an overtime drive led by Orton that resulted in a 41-yard game-winning field goal by Matt Prater. The two teams met in the Divisional round of the 2011 playoffs, with the Patriots blowing out Tim Tebow and the Broncos by a score of 45–10. The Broncos' rivalry with the Patriots later intensified when longtime Indianapolis Colts' quarterback Peyton Manning became the Broncos' starting quarterback from 2012 to 2015. Manning and Patriots' quarterback Tom Brady maintained a legendary rivalry from  until Manning's retirement after the  season. Though Brady dominated Manning in regular season play, winning nine of twelve meetings, Manning won three of five playoff meetings, including the Broncos' 26–16 win in the 2013 AFC Championship and the Broncos' 20–18 win in the 2015 AFC Championship.

Pittsburgh Steelers

The Pittsburgh Steelers emerged as a prominent rival in league circles when the Patriots upset the Steelers in the 2001 AFC Championship Game at Heinz Field, though the two teams had met in the postseason twice before; the Patriots defeated the Steelers in 1996 28–3 while the Steelers won 7–6 in 1997; both times, the Patriots fielded players with Pittsburgh-area roots in Ty Law and Curtis Martin. Martin's final game with the Patriots was in the 1997 playoffs before he departed to the rival New York Jets. Following the 2001 AFC title upset, the Patriots defeated the Steelers 30–14 at the start of the 2002 season. Pittsburgh did not exact revenge for the two losses until ending the Patriots' record-setting 21-game winning streak in week 6 of the 2004 NFL season. Later that season, the Steelers lost to the eventual Super Bowl champion Patriots in the AFC Championship game after a 15–1 regular season.

The Patriots in 2013 then made history by becoming the first opponent to score 55 points on the Steelers, winning 55–31. The Patriots won again in 2015 (28–21) and 2016's regular season (27–16), and then won 36–17 in the 2016 AFC Championship Game. They also won in 2017 when a go-ahead touchdown reception by Steelers' tight end Jesse James was controversially called back. Though they ultimately missed the playoffs, the Steelers defeated the Patriots by a score of 17–10 on December 16, 2018, in Pittsburgh.

In the postseason, the Patriots have outscored the Steelers 135–75, with the Patriots maintaining a 4–1 record. The only other franchises with winning AFC playoff records against Steelers include the Los Angeles Chargers (2–1), the Jacksonville Jaguars (2–0), and the Broncos (5–3). The Steelers have an all-time regular-season record of 15–13 against the Patriots. In the Bill Belichick era, the main period of the rivalry, the Patriots have a 12–4 record against the Steelers. In their last matchup, the Patriots beat the Steelers 33–3 on Sunday Night Football.

Oakland/Los Angeles/Las Vegas Raiders

The rivalry between the Patriots and the Oakland/Los Angeles/Las Vegas Raiders dates to their time in the AFL, but was intensified during a 1978 preseason game, when Patriots wide receiver Darryl Stingley was permanently paralyzed after a vicious hit delivered by Raiders free safety Jack Tatum. Before that, the Patriots also lost a playoff game in 1976 to the Raiders; the game is unofficially known as "The Ben Dreith Game" due to a controversial penalty by head referee Dreith. While based in Los Angeles, the Raiders hosted the Patriots in the divisional round of the playoffs in 1986. The game was won by the Patriots and marred by a chaotic rumble between the teams in the end zone as players were leaving the field after the game. The brawl was especially notable for Raiders linebacker Matt Millen attacking GM Patrick Sullivan, son of owner Billy Sullivan, with his helmet. The two teams met in a divisional-round playoff game in 2002, which became known as the "Tuck Rule Game". Late in the game, an incomplete pass, ruled a fumble, by quarterback Tom Brady was overturned, and the Patriots went on to win in overtime and eventually won the Super Bowl against the heavily favored St. Louis Rams. Since that game, the Patriots have won five of the last six regular-season contests between the two teams. The first contest being the following year during the 2002 season in Oakland, with the Raiders winning 27–20; they met in the 2005 season opener in New England with the Patriots ruining Randy Moss' debut as a Raider 30–20; the Patriots defeated the Raiders 49–26 in December 2008 in Bill Belichick's 100th regular-season win as Patriots coach; a Patriots 31–19 win during the 2011 season; a scrappy 16–9 Patriots win in the third week of the 2014 season, and the Patriots' 33–8 win in Mexico City in 2017, and following a last-minute lateral play that went awry, a Raider win 30-24.

Inter-conference rivals

New York Giants

The two teams rarely played each other given they were on opposite conferences, but the rivalry gained notoriety in the late 2000s thanks to some close contests and memorable moments between Tom Brady and Eli Manning. In the 2007 season, the Patriots defeated the Giants 38–35 to clinch a perfect 16–0 regular season, but could not finish a perfect 19–0 season in Super Bowl XLII following a 17–14 defeat. That game featured the now-iconic Helmet Catch from David Tyree. The Giants also defeated the Patriots in Super Bowl XLVI, a 21–17 victory.

Strategy and influence

Under head coach Bill Belichick, the Patriots have employed specific on-field and off-field strategies. On the field, the Patriots have typically used an "Erhardt–Perkins" offense and a "Fairbanks–Bullough" 3–4 defense, referred to commonly as a two-gap 3–4 defensive system. Under Erhardt's, Perkin's and Bullough's stints as coordinators and head coaches across the league after developing the scheme in collaboration with head coach Chuck Fairbanks, the systems developed in New England in the 1970s would begin to see historic use. Influence spread, especially under their coaching tree in Bill Parcells' schemes as head coach of the New York Giants in the mid-to-late 1980s, after serving as a linebacker coach for the Patriots in 1980.  Parcells would come back to New England as head coach in 1993 and re-install the system used in the 1970s and 1980s, re-uniting with Ray Perkins as WR coach. Parcells own coaching tree would use the scheme created in New England as well, especially Belichick, once he was named as head coach after years of being an assistant to Parcells with the New York Giants, the Patriots, and the New York Jets.

Since 2000, the philosophy in making personnel decisions and in game planning has focused on the "team" concept, stressing preparation, strong work ethic, versatility, and lack of individual ego. This approach, which has led to six Super Bowl victories under Belichick, has been analyzed in media such as the 2004 book Patriot Reign, as well as the 2021 documentary miniseries Man in the Arena.

The New England Patriots are noted for the following characteristics under coach Belichick's tenure, dubbed as the "Patriot Way":

 Their self-critical, perfectionist, and militaristic approach
 Their emphasis on team, equality among players and lack of individual ego
 Their strong work ethic, intelligence and high level of focus and preparation for each individual game
 Their versatile players, able to play multiple positions
 Their multiple schemes intended to take advantage of their opponent's weaknesses

Championships

Super Bowl championships

The New England Patriots have won six Super Bowls, the league championship of the NFL. The franchise is tied for the most all-time with the Pittsburgh Steelers. The team repeated as champions between the 2003 and 2004 NFL seasons, the last club to do so among the seven franchises who have accomplished it (Green Bay Packers, Miami Dolphins, Pittsburgh Steelers (twice), San Francisco 49ers, Dallas Cowboys, and the Denver Broncos). Between 2001 and 2004, the Patriots became the second team in NFL history (after the Dallas Cowboys) to win three Super Bowls in four years (2001, 2003, 2004), and are also the last franchise to have achieved it.

AFC championships
The Patriots have won eleven AFC Championships, the record for the most conference championships all-time in the NFL.

Division championships
The Patriots have won 22 Division Championships, which is second place for the most all-time behind the Pittsburgh Steelers and Dallas Cowboys, who are tied in first with 24. One of these divisional titles was won in the AFL in the AFL East (1963), the rest were won in the AFC East of the NFL.

Statistics, records, and awards

Season-by-season results
This is a partial list of the Patriots' last five completed seasons. For the full season-by-season franchise results, see List of New England Patriots seasons.

Note: The Finish, Wins, Losses, and Ties columns list regular season results and exclude any postseason play.

Record vs. opponents
 
|-
| Jacksonville Jaguars || 8 || 1 || 0 ||  || W 50–10 || January 2, 2022 || Foxborough, Massachusetts || 4–1 postseason
|-
| Baltimore Ravens || 9 || 3 || 0 ||  || L 37–26 || September 25, 2022 || Foxborough, Massachusetts || 2–2 postseason
|-
| Houston Texans || 9 || 3 || 0 ||  || W 34–7 || October 10, 2021 || Houston, Texas || 2–0 postseason
|-
| Chicago Bears || 10 || 4 || 0 ||  || L 33–14 || October 24, 2022 || Foxborough, Massachusetts || 0–1 postseason
|-
| Tampa Bay Buccaneers || 7 || 3 || 0 ||  || L 19–17 || October 3, 2021 || Foxborough, Massachusetts ||
|-
| New Orleans Saints || 10 || 5 || 0 ||  || L 28–13 || September 26, 2021 || Foxborough, Massachusetts ||
|-
| Minnesota Vikings || 9 || 5 || 0 ||  || L 33–26 || November 24, 2022 ||  Minneapolis, Minnesota ||
|-
| New York Giants || 7 || 4 || 0 ||  || W 35–14 || October 10, 2019 || Foxborough, Massachusetts || 0–2 postseason
|-
| Cincinnati Bengals || 17 || 10 || 0 ||  || L 22–18 || December 24, 2022 || Foxborough, Massachusetts ||
|-
| Baltimore / Indianapolis Colts || 49 || 29 || 0 ||  || W 27–17 || November 6, 2022 || Foxborough, Massachusetts || 4–1 postseason
|-
| San Diego / Los Angeles Chargers || 24 || 14 || 2 ||  || W 27–24 || October 31, 2021 || Inglewood, California || 3–1 postseason
|-
| Detroit Lions || 8 || 5 || 0 ||  || W 29–0 || October 9, 2022 || Foxborough, Massachusetts ||
|-
| Buffalo Bills || 76 || 48 || 1 ||  || L 35–23 || January 8, 2023 || Buffalo, New York || 1–1 postseason
|-
| Atlanta Falcons || 9 || 6 || 0 ||  || W 25–0 || November 18, 2021 || Atlanta, Georgia || 1–0 postseason
|-
| Houston Oilers / Tennessee Titans || 24 || 16 || 1 ||  || W 36–13 || November 28, 2021 || Foxborough, Massachusetts || 2–2 postseason
|-
| New York Jets || 71 || 53 || 1 ||  || W 10–3 || November 20, 2022 || Foxborough, Massachusetts || 2–1 postseason
|-
| St. Louis / Phoenix / Arizona Cardinals || 9 || 7 || 0 ||  || W 27–13 || December 12, 2022 || Glendale, Arizona ||
|-
| Oakland / Los Angeles / Las Vegas Raiders || 18 || 15 || 1 ||  || L 30–24 || December 18, 2022 || Las Vegas, Nevada || 2–1 postseason
|-
| Cleveland Browns || 14 || 12 || 0 ||  || W 38–15 || October 16, 2022 || Cleveland, Ohio || 0–1 postseason
|-
| St. Louis / Los Angeles Rams || 7 || 6 || 0 ||  || L 24–3 || December 10, 2020 || Inglewood, California || 2–0 postseason
|-
| Green Bay Packers || 6|| 6 || 0 ||  || L 27–24 || October 2, 2022 || Green Bay, Wisconsin || 0–1 postseason
|-
| Pittsburgh Steelers || 14 || 15 || 0 ||  || W 17–14 || September 18, 2022 || Pittsburgh, Pennsylvania || 4–1 postseason
|-
| Miami Dolphins || 53 || 59 || 0 ||  || W 23–21 || January 9, 2023 || Foxborough, Massachusetts || 2–1 postseason
|-
| Philadelphia Eagles || 6 || 7 || 0 ||  || W 17–10 || November 17, 2019 || Philadelphia, Pennsylvania || 1–1 postseason
|-
| Washington Commanders || 5 || 6 || 0 ||  || W 33–7 || October 6, 2019 || Washington, D.C. || 
|-
| Denver Broncos || 22 || 27 || 0 ||  || L 18–12 || October 18, 2020 || Denver, Colorado || 1–4 postseason
|-
| Seattle Seahawks || 8 || 10 || 0 ||  || L 35–30 || September 20, 2020 || Seattle, Washington || 1–0 postseason
|-
| Carolina Panthers || 3 || 4 || 0 ||  || W 24–6 || November 7, 2021 || Charlotte, North Carolina || 1–0 postseason
|-
| Dallas Cowboys || 6 || 8 || 0 ||  || L 35–29 || October 17, 2021 || Foxborough, Massachusetts ||
|-
| Kansas City Chiefs || 14 || 20 || 3 ||  || L 26–10 || October 5, 2020 || Kansas City, Missouri || 2–0 postseason
|-
| San Francisco 49ers || 5 || 9 || 0 ||  || L 33–6 || October 25, 2020 || Foxborough, Massachusetts ||
|-
! Total !! 537 !! 420 !! 9 !!  !! colspan="4"|
|-
! Total including playoffs !! 574 !! 442 !! 9 !!  !! colspan="4"|

Playoff record

All-time leaders

Statistics

Career leaders
Games played: 285 Tom Brady (2000–2019)
Passing yards: 74,571 Tom Brady (2000–2019) (NFL-record for most passing yards with a single team)
Pass completions: 6,377 Tom Brady (2000–2019) (NFL-record for most pass completions with a single team)
Passing touchdowns: 541 Tom Brady (2000–2019) (NFL-record for most passing touchdowns with a single team)
Rushing yards: 5,453 Sam Cunningham (1973–1982)
Rushing touchdowns: 45 Jim Nance (1965–1971)
Receptions: 672 Wes Welker (2007–2012)
Receiving yards: 10,352 Stanley Morgan (1977–1989)
Receiving touchdowns: 79 Rob Gronkowski (2010–2018)
All-purpose yards: 12,340 Kevin Faulk (1999–2011)
Points scored: 1,775 Stephen Gostkowski (2006–2019)
Field goals made: 374 Stephen Gostkowski (2006–2018)
Total punt yardage: 19,922 Rich Camarillo (1981–1987)
Punting average (min. 250 punts): 45.3 Ryan Allen (2013–2018)
Kickoff return yards: 4,098 Kevin Faulk (1999–2011)
Punt Return yards: 2,625 Troy Brown (1993–2007)
Pass interceptions: 36 Raymond Clayborn (1977–1989)/Ty Law (1995–2004)
Sacks: 100.0 Andre Tippett (1982–1993)
Forced fumbles: 17 Tedy Bruschi (1996–2008)

Single-season leaders
Passing yards: 5,235 Tom Brady (2011)
Passing touchdowns: 50 Tom Brady (2007)
Rushing yards: 1,635 Corey Dillon (2004)
Rushing touchdowns: 18 LeGarrette Blount (2016)
Receptions: 123 Wes Welker (2009)
Receiving yards: 1,569 Wes Welker (2011)
Receiving touchdowns: 23 Randy Moss (2007) (NFL-record for most receiving touchdowns in a single-season)
Points: 158 Stephen Gostkowski (2013)
Field goals made: 38 Stephen Gostkowski (2013)
Total punt yardage: 4,227 Shawn McCarthy (1992)
Punting average: 48.7 Jake Bailey (2020)
Kickoff return yards: 1,281 Ellis Hobbs (2008)
Punt return yards: 608 Mike Haynes (1976)
Pass interceptions: 11 Ron Hall (1964)
Sacks: 18.5 Andre Tippett (1984)

Individual awards

The following Patriots have received these league honorific awards. They are specifically from the Associated Press, except for two cases: The NFL in the case of the Super Bowl MVP and the Pro Football Writers of America in the case of the Executive of the Year award. Seasons in which the AFL counterparts of the awards were won (1960–1969) are labeled.

Bold indicates those elected to the Pro Football Hall of Fame.

Players of note

Current roster

Pro Football Hall of Famers

The Pro Football Hall of Fame has inducted 6 players who made their primary contribution to professional football while with the Patriots. The Patriots' total number of Pro Football Hall of Famers is 12, 10 players and 2 coaches.

Notes:
 Hall of Famers who made the major part of their primary contribution for the Patriots are listed in bold.
 Hall of Famers who spent only a minor portion of their career with the Patriots are listed in normal font.

Additional note:

 Raymond Berry was inducted for his tenure as a player (outside of New England), not as a head coach.

Retired numbers

The Patriots have officially retired seven uniform numbers. The organization has not retired any numbers since 2001, likely to keep a healthy amount of numbers available to the up-to 90-man pre-season roster. Half of the players played for the original AFL-era Boston Patriots. Bruce Armstrong (1987–2000) is by far the most recent player to have their jersey retired. Five of the seven numbers were retired prior to Robert Kraft's current tenure as owner since 1994. As of 2020, number 12 has been kept out of circulation, otherwise the Patriots have currently abstained from reducing any other number un-officially regardless of stature.

12 Tom Brady

Patriots Hall of Fame

The Patriots Hall of Fame features 29 former players and three contributors as a part of the franchise's own hall of fame, founded to independently honor significant members of the organization within the club's history. It was established in 1991, with John Hannah being the inaugural member.

The physical Patriots Hall of Fame building opened in 2008 outside of the stadium at Patriot Place, presented by Raytheon Technologies. Featuring a vast collection of game-worn gear, game-used equipment, memorabilia, trophies, in addition to multiple exhibits using audio and video technology, it is periodically renovated and updated yearly. It is described as a "modern, interactive museum".

A committee of media and staff selected 11 players for enshrinement between 1991 and 2001, before a six-year span of no selections. In 2007, in advance of the grand opening of the physical Patriots Hall of Fame in 2008, the club introduced a new nomination committee to select three candidates, with the winner of an internet fan vote being enshrined in the hall of fame. In order to be eligible, players and coaches must be retired for at least four years. Beginning in 2011, and meeting every four years, a senior selection committee has the option of voting a player who has been retired for at least 25 seasons into the hall of fame, alongside the traditional inductee.

Starting in 2009, contributors have been allowed to be periodically voted into the Patriots Hall of Fame. Former team owner and founder Billy Sullivan was posthumously inducted by owner Robert Kraft in March 2009, before the Patriots' 50th season, as the first contributor inducted.

Note:
 † = Posthumous induction

NFL All-Decade and Anniversary team selections

The following Patriots were named to the AFL All-Time Team (1960–1969), as well any NFL All-Decade Team after the AFL–NFL merger in 1970 (and NFL 75th and 100th Anniversary All-Time Teams, selected in 1994 and 2019, respectively). Only those who spent time with New England during the respective decades are listed for All-Decade team selections.

Bold indicates those elected to the Pro Football Hall of Fame.

Patriots All-Decade teams
Starting in 2010, every ten years the Patriots Hall of Fame committee will release an all-decade team to celebrate the greatest members of the team at every position during each respective decade. The committee has retroactively released all-decade teams for every decade prior to the 2000s.

1960s (AFL)
In November 1971, fans voted on a 10-year Patriots anniversary team, which coincided with the team's 10 years in the then-defunct American Football League: Additional selections for returner, special teamer, and coach were added in 2009:

Bold indicates those elected to the Pro Football Hall of Fame.

1970s
In March 2009, as part of the Patriots' 50th anniversary, a group of local media and other team figures selected all-decade teams for the 1970s, 1980s, and 1990s:

Bold indicates those elected to the Pro Football Hall of Fame.

1980s
In March 2009, as part of the Patriots' 50th anniversary, a group of local media and other team figures selected all-decade teams for the 1970s, 1980s, and 1990s:

Bold indicates those elected to the Pro Football Hall of Fame.

1990s
In March 2009, as part of the Patriots' 50th anniversary, a group of local media and other team figures selected all-decade teams for the 1970s, 1980s, and 1990s:

Bold indicates those elected to the Pro Football Hall of Fame.

2000s
On March 16, 2010, the Patriots Hall of Fame selection committee selected an all-decade team for the 2000s:

Bold indicates those elected to the Pro Football Hall of Fame.

2010s
On April 29, 2020, the Patriots Hall of Fame selection committee selected an all-decade team for the 2010s:

Patriots Anniversary teams
Periodically, the Patriots Hall of Fame committee will release an anniversary team to celebrate the greatest members of the team at every position up to the year of publication.

35th Anniversary team (1994)
In 1994, a group of local media selected a 35th anniversary team:

Bold indicates those elected to the Pro Football Hall of Fame.

50th Anniversary team (2009)
In 2009, the Patriots Hall of Fame selection committee selected a 50th anniversary team:

Bold indicates those elected to the Pro Football Hall of Fame.

All-Dynasty team (2001–2019)
On October 22, 2020, the Patriots Hall of Fame selection committee selected an "All-Dynasty Team" to celebrate the greatest members of the team at every position during the Patriots dynasty from 2001–2019:

Bold indicates those elected to the Pro Football Hall of Fame.

Pro Bowl selections 
The following Patriots players have been named to the Pro Bowl (or the AFL All-Star game prior to 1970):

Two Patriots has been named Pro Bowl MVP, Vito "Babe" Parilli in 1966 (AFL), and Ty Law as co-MVP in 1998.

In addition to the players, three Patriots coaches have participated in the Pro Bowl as conference coaches. Mike Holovak in 1963 and 1966 (AFL), Chuck Fairbanks in 1978, and Bill Belichick in 2006 and 2010.

QB Tom Brady (14), Drew Bledsoe, Vito "Babe" Parilli (3) (AFL), Mac Jones, Mike Taliaferro 
FB Larry Garron (4) (AFL), Jim Nance (2) (AFL), Sam Cunningham, James Develin
HB Curtis Martin (2), Tony Collins, Corey Dillon, John Stephens, Craig James, Carl Garrett (AFL)
LT Bruce Armstrong (6), Matt Light, Brian Holloway (3), Leon Gray (2), Don Oakes (AFL)
LG John Hannah (9), Logan Mankins (6), Charley Long (2) (AFL), Charley Leo (AFL)
C Jon Morris (7) (AFL), Damien Woody, Dan Koppen
RG Billy Neighbors (AFL), Len St. Jean (AFL), Brian Waters
RT Tom Neville (AFL), Dick Klein (AFL)
TE Rob Gronkowski, Ben Coates (5), Russ Francis (3), Marv Cook (2)
WR Wes Welker, Gino Cappelletti (5) (AFL), Stanley Morgan (4), Randy Moss, Troy Brown, Terry Glenn, Irving Fryar, Ron Sellers (AFL), Jim Colclough (AFL)
DE Richard Seymour (5), Bob Dee (4) (AFL), Larry Eisenhauer (4) (AFL), Julius Adams, Andre Carter, Chandler Jones
DT Houston Antwine (6) (AFL), Vince Wilfork (5), Jim Lee Hunt (4) (AFL)
LB Andre Tippett, Nick Buoniconti (5) (AFL), Tom Addison (4) (AFL), Steve Nelson (3), Johnny Rembert, Willie McGinest, Jerod Mayo, Dont'a Hightower, Matthew Judon (2), Chris Slade, Tedy Bruschi, Mike Vrabel, Jamie Collins
CB Mike Haynes (6), Ty Law (4), Stephon Gilmore (3), Dick Felt (AFL), Chuck Shonta (AFL), Leroy Mitchell (AFL), Asante Samuel, Devin McCourty, Aqib Talib, Darrelle Revis, Malcolm Butler, J.C. Jackson
SS Lawyer Milloy (4), Fred Bruney (2) (AFL), Ron Hall (AFL), 
FS Brandon Meriweather (2), Don Webb (AFL), Fred Marion, Devin McCourty
PK Stephen Gostkowski (4), Adam Vinatieri (2), John Smith, Tony Franklin
P Rich Camarillo, Jake Bailey
ST Matthew Slater (10), Raymond Clayborn (3), Larry Izzo (2), Mosi Tatupu, Dave Meggett

First-team All-Pro selections
The following Patriots players have been named AP First-team All-Pro (or All-AFL prior to 1970):

 
QB Tom Brady (3), Vito "Babe" Parilli (AFL)
FB Jim Nance (AFL) (2)
LT Leon Gray (3), Matt Light
LG John Hannah (7), Logan Mankins 
C Jon Morris (AFL)
RG Billy Neighbors (AFL)
TE Rob Gronkowski (4), Ben Coates (2), Marv Cook, Jim Whalen (AFL) 
WR Wes Welker (2), Randy Moss
DE Richard Seymour, Larry Eisenhauer (AFL) (3)
DT Houston Antwine (AFL), Vince Wilfork
LB Nick Buoniconti (4) (AFL), Andre Tippett (2), Tom Addison (AFL), Mike Vrabel, Jerod Mayo
CB Ty Law, Stephon Gilmore (2), Asante Samuel, Darrelle Revis
SS Ron Hall (AFL), Lawyer Milloy, Rodney Harrison
PK Adam Vinatieri, Stephen Gostkowski (2)
P  Jake Bailey
ST Matthew Slater (2), Gunner Olszewski, Marcus Jones

All-time first-round draft picks

Administration and personnel

Ownership
The Patriots have had four owners since becoming a franchise, the first being Massachusetts native Billy Sullivan from 1959 to 1988. During Sullivan's 28 seasons of owning the club, the Patriots tallied 14 winning records, made six playoff appearances, played in the 1963 AFL Championship Game and represented the AFC in Super Bowl XX. However, he was also notoriously cheap, and would cause friction with some his high-profile players who were seeking to be respected and paid what they were worth, causing someone such as future Pro Football Hall of Famer Mike Haynes to seek an owner who was team first.

Following his bankruptcy, Sullivan sold the team to Remington Products owner Victor Kiam in 1988.  The sale did not include Foxboro Stadium, which Sullivan lost in a bankruptcy sale to paper magnate Robert Kraft, and Kiam lost money on the deal.  In 1990, Lisa Olson, a Boston Herald reporter, sued Kiam and the Patriots when Zeke Mowatt allegedly exposed himself and made lewd comments to her in the team change room. The incident stirred debate over female reporters in the locker room. Kiam became the center of the controversy when he came to the defense of the players' actions.

In his later career, Kiam's business interests moved on from the Patriots, so he sold them in 1992 to St. Louis businessman James Orthwein. During his ownership, Orthwein hired Bill Parcells as head coach and oversaw the drafting of first-overall draft pick quarterback Drew Bledsoe, who helped to return the moribund franchise to respectability. He planned to relocate the Patriots franchise to St. Louis, renaming the team the St. Louis Stallions. However, those plans were derailed when Boston paper magnate Robert Kraft, owner of Foxboro Stadium, refused to accept a buyout of the lease. Kraft used his ownership of the stadium to stage a hostile takeover, offering to pay $175 million for the Patriots franchise knowing that Orthwein no longer wanted the team if he could not move it to St. Louis. Although future St. Louis/Los Angeles Rams owner Stan Kroenke offered to buy the team for $200 million and move it to St. Louis, Orthwein would have been saddled with all moving expenses. He also would have been responsible for any legal expenses as well, and Kraft had already made it clear that he would go to court to enforce the lease. With no other choice, Orthwein accepted Kraft's bid on January 21, 1994.

Kraft had been a life-long fan (he was a season ticket holder since 1971) before he purchased the team and intended to support them much more than all of the previous owners did, making multiple moves that have turned New England into an admirable franchise since. The Patriots under Kraft have been the NFL's most successful franchise since 1994. Since then, the Patriots have appeared in ten Super Bowls, have won six, and had numerous league records established by the franchise.

Head Coaches

The Patriots have had 14 head coaches throughout their history as a franchise. Bill Belichick has the longest tenure as head coach (23 seasons) with the Patriots, and has been coach since 2000. He has been widely considered one of the greatest coaches of all time, and was named a member of the NFL 100th All-Time Anniversary Team, due to his numerous accomplishments with the Patriots. He has specifically led the Patriots to 17 AFC East division titles, 13 appearances in the AFC Championship Game, and nine Super Bowl appearances, with a record six wins.

Belichick is the NFL's longest-tenured active head coach, as well as the first all-time in playoff coaching wins with 31 and third in regular season coaching wins in the NFL with 297. He is one of only three head coaches who have won six NFL titles. He was named the AP NFL Coach of the Year for the 2003, 2007, and 2010 seasons. Belichick has led the team for more regular season games (336), post-season games (42) and more complete seasons (23) than any other head coach.  His 262 wins with the Patriots are far and away the most in franchise history, more than three times those of runner-up Mike Holovak.

Belichick was acquired in a "trade" with the rival New York Jets. Belichick did not want to be under Bill Parcells' authority there in 2000, with uncertainty of his role once their owner, Leon Hess, died. The initial promise was that Belichick would've been granted extreme authority over all of the Jets executive decisions, but when Hess passed away Parcells overruled the stipulation with loopholes, so he would remain in control as general manager, leading to Belichick's infamous resignation in 2000. Parcells, a two winning Super Bowl champion coach with the New York Giants (also was an assistant with the Patriots in the early 1980s), had joined New England's staff for the 1993 season to help resurrect the franchise from its dark early 1990s days but had conflicted interests with owner Robert Kraft. In his last year with the Patriots in 1996, Parcells brought in his assistant head coach from his Giants days, Belichick, after being dismissed from coaching five seasons with the Cleveland Browns. Here, Kraft would plant the seeds of a bond between him and Belichick, as Belichick would often mediate issues between Kraft and Parcells. Although Belichick left in 1997 to once again be Parcells assistant in their Jets regime, cold feet about his long-term role there brought him back after negotiating with Kraft, even though he was still under contract with the Jets. The Patriots had technically "tampered" in communicating with Belichick. For compensation, the Patriots gave the Jets their first round pick in the 2000 NFL draft, where even without their first round pick, the Patriots would coincidentally draft Tom Brady in the sixth round, widely regarded as the greatest quarterback of all time and the NFL's greatest draft steal.

While Belichick led the team to nine of their eleven Super Bowl appearances, winning six of them, before him the Patriots saw some championship game appearances.  Holovak, Raymond Berry and Parcells all led the Patriots to league championship games, with only one coach failing to reach the Super Bowl.  Five Patriots head coaches, Holovak, Chuck Fairbanks, Berry, Parcells, and Belichick, have been named coach of the year by at least one major news organization.  The first head coach in franchise history was Lou Saban, who coached them to a 7–12–0 record in the 1960 season. 

Note:
 * = Interim coach

Offensive coordinator history
Source:

Defensive coordinator history
Source:

Culture

Cheerleaders

The Patriots' professional cheerleading squad is the New England Patriots Cheerleaders which represents the team in the NFL. Notable alumni of the cheerleading squad include wrestler Carmella and model Camille Kostek. Long-time cheerleading director Tracy Sormanti, who was the cheer director since 1994 and had been involved with the organization since 1983, died after a three-year battle with multiple myeloma in 2020. She was inducted into the Patriots Hall of Fame in 2021 as a contributor.

Mascots

The Patriots' official mascot since 1995 has been Pat Patriot, a revolutionary minuteman wearing a Patriots home jersey based on the original logo of the same name.

The Patriots also employ a corps known as the End Zone Militia, a group of American Revolutionary War reenactors founded in 1996 by Geoff Campbell, a reenactor for the 9th Massachusetts Regiment (26th Continental Regiment). Consisting of about 30 men and women, they dress 20 for each home game and split themselves into two groups of 10 lining the back of either end zone. When the Patriots score – whether it be a touchdown, field goal, point-after-touchdown or safety – the militia behind the opposite end zone fire a volley of blanks from flintlock muskets. Per an interview with the Loren & Wally Show on WROR 105.7 FM in and around the time of Super Bowl XLIX, said shots use double the load of black powder than a regular historical reenactor does, specifically 200 grains, in order to be heard throughout the stadium. ESPN writer Josh Pahigian named this one of the top ten celebrations in the league in 2007.

Entrance theme
Ozzy Osbourne's "Crazy Train" has become an unofficial theme song and entrance anthem for the Patriots at their home games and Super Bowls, starting when they hosted the NFL Kickoff at Gillette Stadium on September 8, 2005.

Radio and television 

The Patriots' flagship radio station is WBZ-FM (98.5 FM, otherwise known as "The Sports Hub"), owned by Beasley Broadcast Group. The larger radio network is called the New England Patriots Radio Network, whose 37 affiliate stations span seven states. Gil Santos and Gino Cappelletti were the longtime announcing team until their retirement following the conclusion of the 2012 NFL season. Santos was replaced by Bob Socci. Former Patriots QB Scott Zolak joined the radio team in the 2011 season as a sideline analyst, and in 2013, he replaced Cappelletti as color commentator.

Any preseason games not on national television are shown on CBS's O&O WBZ-TV, who also airs the bulk of Patriots regular-season games by virtue of CBS having the rights to most AFC games; CBS also has a presence at the nearby Patriot Place with the "CBS Scene" bar and restaurant. During the regular season whenever the Patriots host an NFC team, the games are aired on Fox affiliate WFXT-TV, and NBC Sunday Night Football games are carried by Boston NBC station WBTS-CD. Preseason games were broadcast on ABC affiliate WCVB-TV from 1995 until the change to WBZ in 2009 (WCVB continues to simulcast ESPN's Monday Night Football games featuring the Patriots). Don Criqui was play-by-play announcer for the 1995–2012 seasons, with Randy Cross as a color commentator and Mike Lynch as a sideline reporter. Lynch was replaced by WBZ reporter Steve Burton in 2009.

Controversies

Snowplow Game

During a December 12, 1982 home game against the Miami Dolphins under icy conditions, the game remained scoreless until the fourth quarter when Patriots head coach Ron Meyer motioned to snowplow operator Mark Henderson to specifically clear a spot on the field for New England kicker John Smith so he could kick what proved to be the game-winning 33-yard field goal to give the Patriots a 3–0 win. At the time, an emergency ground rule was put into play where the officials could call time-out and allow the ground crew to use a snowplow to clear the yard markers, but not plow often enough to keep the field clear. Dolphins head coach Don Shula, believing it to be against the league rules, pointed out that the league's unfair act clause allowed the league to overturn it, and met with NFL commissioner Pete Rozelle several days later to formally protest the game result. Although Rozelle agreed with Shula that the use of the plow gave the Patriots an unfair advantage, he said that he had never reversed the result of a game and was not going to start doing so for any reason, including cheating. Henderson, a convict on work release, jokingly remarked, "What are they gonna do, throw me in jail?"

The following year, the NFL banned the use of snowplows on the field during a game. The Patriots organization has commemorated the game with an exhibit at the Hall at Patriot Place within Gillette Stadium, where the plow itself hangs from the ceiling.

Spygate

During the 2007 season, the New England Patriots were disciplined by the league for videotaping New York Jets' defensive coaches' signals from an unauthorized location during a September 9, 2007 game. Videotaping opposing coaches is not illegal in the NFL de jure, but there are designated areas allowed by the league to do such taping. After an investigation, the NFL fined Patriots head coach Bill Belichick $500,000 for his role in the incident, fined the Patriots $250,000, and docked the team their original first-round selection in the 2008 NFL Draft, which would have been the 31st pick of the draft.

Deflategate

During the 2015 AFC Championship Game against the Indianapolis Colts, allegations arose that the Patriots were using under-inflated footballs. It was even suggested that the Patriots' staff themselves deliberately deflated the footballs to give their team an unfair advantage during the playoffs. A lengthy investigation and heated debate commenced shortly afterwards, with a full report being published in May 2015. The Wells Report found that balls provided by the Patriots, who were the home team, indeed had less pressure on average than the balls provided by the Colts. Also notable was the findings of some suggestions of communication between Tom Brady and two Patriots locker room attendants, indicating Brady was likely "generally aware" of the situation and that the Patriots staff intentionally deflated the footballs. A later study by the American Enterprise Institute called the evidence and methodology of the Wells report "deeply flawed" and "unreliable".

In the aftermath of the incident, the NFL suspended Brady without pay for the first four games of the 2015 season, fined the Patriots $1million, and forced them to forfeit their 2016 first round draft pick and 2017 fourth round draft pick. Brady appealed his suspension, which was eventually vacated by the United States District Court for the Southern District of New York, only for the United States Court of Appeals for the Second Circuit to reinstate it a year later for the 2016 NFL season. Brady eventually agreed to serve the suspension in 2016, but led the Patriots to win Super Bowl LI in spite of it.

See also
 Forbes list of the most valuable sports teams
 List of Super Bowl records
 List of National Football League records (team)
 Active NFL playoff appearance streaks
 Sports in Massachusetts
 Sports in Boston

Notes and references
Explanatory notes

Citations

Further reading

External links

 
 Official Patriots Hall of Fame website
 New England Patriots at the National Football League official website
 "New England Patriots collected news and commentary" The New York Times

 
 
1950s in Boston
1959 establishments in Massachusetts
American Football League teams
American football teams established in 1959
American football teams in Boston
National Football League teams
Sports in Foxborough, Massachusetts